AFL may refer to:

Sports 
 American Football League (AFL), a name shared by several separate and unrelated professional American football leagues:
 American Football League (1926) (a.k.a. "AFL I"), first rival of the National Football League (NFL) that competed in 1926
 American Football League (1934), regional borderline-major league that competed in 1934
 American Football League (1936) (a.k.a. "AFL II"), second rival of the NFL that competed in 1936 and 1937
 American Football League (1938), minor professional American football league that changed its name to the American Professional Football Association in 1939
 American Football League (1940) (a.k.a. "AFL III"), third rival of the NFL that competed in 1940 and 1941
 American Football League (1944), offshoot of the Pacific Coast Professional Football League, played one year before merging back with the PCPFL
 American Football League (1946), name adopted by the American Association minor American football league in 1946
 American Football League (a.k.a. "AFL IV"), an American football league, active from 1960 to 1970
 Arena Football League, a former American indoor football league 
 Australian Football League, an Australian rules football league 
 Alberta Football League, an amateur Canadian football league
 American Fencing League, a league for amateur standard fencing competition in the United States
 Anti-Football League, an organisation that bemoans the cultural saturation of the Australian Football League
 Arizona Fall League, an American off-season baseball league owned and operated by Major League Baseball
 AFL (video game series), a series of Australian rules football video games
 AFL (Wii), an Australian Rules Football video game for the Nintendo Wii
 Austrian Football League, the highest league of American football in Austria

Aviation
 Aeroflot, ICAO airline code AFL
 Alta Floresta Airport, IATA airport code AFL, in Alta Floresta, Brazil

Education
 Ankara Science High School, a high school in Ankara, Turkey natively referred to as Ankara Fen Liesi
 Assessment for learning

Science and technology
 American fuzzy lop (fuzzer), a fuzzer
 Astrobiology Field Laboratory, a proposed and subsequently cancelled (unfunded) robotic rover to be sent to planet Mars
 Atrial flutter, a form of cardiac arrhythmia

Other uses
 Adaptive front light, of an automobile
 Abstract family of languages
 Academic Free License, a software license
 Aflac, American insurance company (NYSE ticker: AFL)
 Alberta Federation of Labour
 American Federation of Labor, one of the first federations of labor unions in the United States, and now part of the AFL-CIO
 Anti-Federalist League, a former British political party
 Armed Forces of Liberia
 Australian Freedom League